The 1998 Penn State Nittany Lions football team represented the Pennsylvania State University in the 1998 NCAA Division I-A football season. The team was coached by Joe Paterno and played its home games in Beaver Stadium in University Park, Pennsylvania.

Schedule
Penn State did not play Big Ten teams Indiana and Iowa this year.

Rankings

Roster

Post season

NFL Draft
Two Nittany Lions were drafted in the 1999 NFL Draft.

References

Penn State
Penn State Nittany Lions football seasons
Lambert-Meadowlands Trophy seasons
ReliaQuest Bowl champion seasons
Penn State Nittany Lions football